Brian Thomas Falkenborg (born January 18, 1978) is a former professional baseball relief pitcher. He played in Major League Baseball (MLB) for the Baltimore Orioles, Los Angeles Dodgers, San Diego Padres, and St. Louis Cardinals and in Nippon Professional Baseball (NPB) for the Fukuoka SoftBank Hawks and Tohoku Rakuten Golden Eagles.

Career
Falkenborg graduated from Redmond High School. He was 6-2 with a 0.75 ERA and 75 strikeouts as a senior at Redmond. He was selected by the Baltimore Orioles in the second round of the  MLB Draft and signed with the Orioles on July 6, 1996.

He began his professional career with the GCL Orioles in the Rookie level Gulf Coast League in 1996. He also pitched in one game for the Single-A High Desert Mavericks that season.

He made his major league debut for the Orioles on October 1, 1999, pitching two scoreless innings of relief against the Boston Red Sox.

He underwent Tommy John surgery in the off-season and missed the entire  season. Falkenborg was signed as a free agent by the Seattle Mariners and spent the  season with the Mariners minor league affiliates at San Antonio and Tacoma. He stayed with Tacoma through the  season, despite battling an assortment of injuries that led to him spending significant time on the disabled list.

Falkenborg signed with the Los Angeles Dodgers for the  season, but spent most of the year with the Triple-A Las Vegas 51s, appearing in only six major league games for the Dodgers, working 14.1 innings and finishing with a 7.53 ERA. He did record his first major league victory on May 9, 2004, in a 14 inning game against the Pittsburgh Pirates.

He spent the  season with the San Diego Padres organization, appearing in 10 games for the Padres, and finishing with an 8.18 ERA. The bulk of his season was spent with the Triple-A Portland Beavers.

He was released by the Cardinals on November 20, 2007, and on December 12, 2007, signed a minor league contract with an invitation to spring training with the Dodgers. He failed to make the Dodgers roster out of spring training and was assigned to the Las Vegas 51s, eventually joining the Dodgers major league roster on June 25. He was designated for assignment on August 8. He was claimed off outright waivers by the San Diego Padres on August 13.

SoftBank Hawks
In November 2008, Falkenborg signed with the Fukuoka SoftBank Hawks of Nippon Professional Baseball.

Used as a set-up man with the Hawks in his first season, Falkenborg performed well above expectations in the 2009 season. He did not allow one earned run in spring training and that streak extended until the last week of May. Teaming with rookie set-up man Tadashi Settsu and closer Takahiro Mahara, the tall righty finished second in the Pacific League in holds behind Settsu. The trio was nicknamed "SBM", (short for Settsu, Brian, Mahara), and Falkenborg was named to the Pacific League All-Star Team.

Falkenborg ran into some trouble late in the season as he came down with elbow tightness in August. He was taken off the active roster twice, once for the injury, and again in late September to shut him down for the season as he was having trouble recovering for the injury. He had also been taken off the active roster earlier in the season due to the birth of his second child. Still, Falkenborg finished with a 6-0 record, one save, and a 1.74 ERA to go with 61 strikeouts in 51 and 2/3 innings.

He was even better in the 2010 regular season. Used as the 8th inning reliever behind Settsu, Falkenborg gave up one run in his 5th appearance of the season against the Tohoku Rakuten Golden Eagles on April 3. From there, he began a streak of 19 straight appearances without giving up an earned run, a streak that ended on May 29 against the Chunichi Dragons. After that, he went two months without giving up an earned run before melting down in two consecutive appearances against the Saitama Seibu Lions and Orix Buffaloes. Still, Falkenborg finished with a record of 3-2 with one save and a 1.02 ERA. However, he was not as good in the playoffs, as he gave up five earned runs in just two innings of work for a 22.50 ERA. Despite this, he was signed to a 2-year contract extension by the Hawks.

Falkenborg rebounded from the bad postseason to have another great season in a Hawks uniform. With regular closer Mahara missing most of the season due to the death of his mother, mechanical problems and injury, Falkenborg took on the role of closer. He was 1-2 with a 1.42 ERA in 47 and 1/3 innings (50 appearances), and he also recorded 19 saves, tied for the club lead with Mahara, who returned at the end of the season. The big American also vanquished his playoff demons as he pitched in six total playoff games, giving up one run in seven and 1/3 innings, with two walks and 11 strikeouts. He made five appearances in the 2011 Japan Series against the Chunichi Dragons, giving up no runs and striking out 10.

References

External links
 

1978 births
Living people
Sportspeople from Newport Beach, California
Baseball players from California
Major League Baseball pitchers
Gulf Coast Orioles players
High Desert Mavericks players
Bowie Baysox players
Frederick Keys players
San Antonio Missions players
Tacoma Rainiers players
Baltimore Orioles players
Los Angeles Dodgers players
San Diego Padres players
St. Louis Cardinals players
Portland Beavers players
Memphis Redbirds players
Las Vegas 51s players
American expatriate baseball players in Japan
Nippon Professional Baseball pitchers
Fukuoka SoftBank Hawks players
Tohoku Rakuten Golden Eagles players